This article is the discography of Canadian rock band Bachman–Turner Overdrive.

Albums

Studio albums

Live albums

Compilation albums

Singles

Notes

References

External links

Discographies of Canadian artists
Rock music group discographies